Greg Schultz is a film, television, advertising and new media producer.

He is an Emmy Award Winner who has produced the 2008 Emmy Award Winning Best Drama Mad Men and Ten Days That Unexpectedly Changed America.

Filmography
 Mad Men - 2005
 Ten Days That Unexpectedly Changed America - 2005
 Iconoclasts - 2005
 The Exonerated - 2004
 Battlegrounds: Ball or Fall - 2003
 Parking Lot - 2003
 Report from Ground Zero - 2002
 The Life - 2001

References

External links
 

Living people
Santa Clara University alumni
American film producers
American television producers
Year of birth missing (living people)